The 1st Army Corps, also known as the 1st Military Unit is a regional military formation of the Armenian Army, located in the city of Goris in the Syunik Province. It helps make up Armenia's southeastern military positions.

Overview 
After the First Nagorno-Karabakh War, the development of army building imposed the need to form large military units. This resulted in the corps creation on 20 June 1996 at the initiative of General Yuri Khatchaturov. A tank crew of the corps participated in the "Tank Biathlon-2017" international competition. In September 2020, a subdivision of the corps participated in the "Caucasus-2020" command-staff military exercise in Russia. During the Second Nagorno-Karabakh War, the corps was deployed in the Aghdara District. The Azerbaijani Ministry of Defence indicated that the corps was one of three units with white phosphorus in their possession.

Structure 

The corps has the following structure:

 Headquarters (Goris)
 2nd Independent Motorized Rifle Brigade "Vardan Mamikonian" (Goris, previously partially stationed in Karakhanbeyli)
 14th Independent Motorized Rifle Regiment (Kapan, made up of the former 83rd Motor Rifle Brigade and the 97th Independent Motorized Rifle Brigade)
 522nd Motorized Rifle Regiment (Sisian)
 539th Motorized Rifle Regiment (Agarak)
 155th Artillery Regiment
 25th Independent Tank Battalion
 585th Independent Reconnaissance Battalion
 Logistics Battalion
 1st Army Corps Concert Orchestra (conducted by Captain Samvel Hayrapetyan)

Other small units include the 5th Mountain Rifle Regiment of the 10th Mountain Rifle Division.

Commanders 
The following have served as commanders of the corps:

 Colonel General Yuri Khachaturov (1996 – 1997)
Lieutenant General Manvel Grigoryan (1996 – 2000)
 Major General Leon Yeranosyan (– 8 October 2003)
 Major General Garegin Gabrielyan (8 October 2003 – 20 July 2007)
 Colonel Poghos Poghosyan (20 July 2007 – 2010)
 Major General Kamo Aghajanyan (2010 – 21 March 2013)
 Major General Tigran Parvanyan (21 March 2013 – 16 February 2018)
 Ararat Melkumyan (16 February 2018 – 18 June 2018)
 Major General Jirayr Poghosyan (18 June 2018 – present)

References 

Syunik Province
Military units and formations established in 1996
Army corps of Armenia